Yadegaran Expressway is in western Tehran. Yadegaran means (Republic) Memorial.
It starts from Evin and goes a few kilometers to the west, then turns south and ends in Azadi Avenue.

Expressways in Tehran
Expressways in Iran